Blaesoxipha is a genus of flies belonging to the family Sarcophagidae.

The genus has cosmopolitan distribution.

Species:
 Blaesoxipha acridiophagoides Lopes & Downs, 1951 
 Blaesoxipha aculeata (Aldrich, 1916)

References

Sarcophagidae